Lautzenhausen is an Ortsgemeinde – a municipality belonging to a Verbandsgemeinde, a kind of collective municipality – in the Rhein-Hunsrück-Kreis (district) in Rhineland-Palatinate, Germany. It belongs to the Verbandsgemeinde of Kirchberg, whose seat is in the like-named town.

Geography

Location
The municipality lies on a high plateau in the Hunsrück. Great parts of the municipal area are covered by Frankfurt-Hahn Airport. Lautzenhausen is linked to the long-distance road network by Bundesstraße 50. The municipal area measures 495 ha.

History
Archaeological finds bear witness to a Roman presence in the area. In 1260, Lautzenhausen had its first documentary mention. Beginning in 1794, Lautzenhausen lay under French rule. In 1814 it was assigned to the Kingdom of Prussia at the Congress of Vienna. Since 1946, it has been part of the then newly founded state of Rhineland-Palatinate.

Until the 1950s, the village was characterized by agriculture. This changed when the air base – now a civil airport – was built. It was first planned by the French in 1946, but was, however, subsequently built by the Americans. They named it “Hahn Air Base” after nearby Hahn because, as a local joke had it, they could not pronounce “Lautzenhausen”. This is highly unlikely to be true, for the name “Lautzenhausen” would present no pronunciation difficulties to an English speaker. A somewhat likelier explanation is that a great part of the air base lay within Hahn's limits, as can be seen in some plans from the time it was built. Since the base's main gate stood right at the entrance to Lautzenhausen, a cutoff point arose right in the municipality between military and civilian zones. For the municipality, it was a divide that lasted decades. Buildings, some of which had been used for farming, were converted, and new buildings were added. They eventually housed hotels, inns, bars and businesses associated with a red-light district, so that the G.I.’s from the base could be offered something by way of recreation during their off-duty time.

Politics

Municipal council
The council is made up of 8 council members, who were elected by majority vote at the municipal election held on 7 June 2009, and the honorary mayor as chairman.

Mayor
Lautzenhausen's mayor is Corina Velten.

Coat of arms
The German blazon reads: Unter blauem Schildhaupt, darin eine silberne Doppelschwinge, blau-gold geschachtes Schild mit überhöhter, eingebogener blauer Spitze, darin ein silberner Brunnen.

The municipality's arms might in English heraldic language be described thus: Tierced in mantle, each side chequy Or and azure, in base azure a village fountain with two spouts argent, on a chief of the second a pair of wings conjoined of the third.

The "chequy" pattern and the predominant tinctures (Or and azure, that is, gold and blue) refer to the former lordly landholders in the area, the Counts of Sponheim (from the "Further" County, in this case). For decades, Lautzenhausen was in close association with the United States Air Force's Hahn Air Base, which held considerable economic importance to the municipality. Standing for this is the charge on the chief, a pair of wings. In base is a stylized representation of a long vanished village fountain, meant to recall the community's focal point, and by extension, the sense of community that is so basic to village life.

Culture and sightseeing

Buildings
The following are listed buildings or sites in Rhineland-Palatinate's Directory of Cultural Monuments:
 Büchenbeurener Straße 11 – former school (?); building with hipped roof and knee wall, partly slated, latter half of the 19th century
 Hauptstraße 22 – L-shaped estate complex, whole complex of buildings; timber-frame house, plastered or slated, 18th or 19th century, timber-frame barn

Lautzenhausen in film
In 1960 and 1961, the film Black Gravel (Schwarzer Kies) directed by Helmut Käutner, was shot in Lautzenhausen. The film tells the story of a man named Robert Neidhardt (Helmut Wildt), a gravel dealer in the fictitious village of "Sohnen", who, on the sly, sells gravel to smaller companies which was meant for building the runway at the nearby air base. He must flee when the police find out about his unlawful deals, and this leads to great misfortune for himself as well as others.

The use of the German word schwarz ("black") in the title does not refer to the gravel's colour, but rather imparts the meaning of illegality, as in "black market".

References

External links

 Municipality's official webpage 

Municipalities in Rhineland-Palatinate
Rhein-Hunsrück-Kreis